Aïssa Messaoudi, nom de guerre Tayeb el-Afghani, was an Algerian Islamist. He fought in the Afghan War. Together with a fellow Afghan veteran, Abderrahmane Dahane, he launched an attack on the Guemmar barracks on November 27, 1991, before the start of the Algerian Civil War proper; this attack is sometimes considered to mark the beginning of the Armed Islamic Movement (MIA).  He was arrested on January 28, 1992.

He was sentenced to death on 4 May 1992. He died in November 1992.

References

1992 deaths
Algerian military personnel
Year of birth missing
Terrorism in Algeria
Algerian Islamists
Muslims with branch missing
Islamic terrorism in Algeria